Viersen is the capital of the district of Viersen, in North Rhine-Westphalia, Germany.

Geography
Viersen is situated approximately 8 km north-west of Mönchengladbach, 15 km south-west of Krefeld and 20 km east of Venlo (Netherlands).

Division of the town
The city of Viersen is made up of three (formerly independent) cities: Süchteln, Dülken and Viersen, which combined in 1970, and one former village, Boisheim, which combined with Viersen in 1968.

Politics
The current mayor of Viersen is Sabine Anemüller of the Social Democratic Party (SPD) since 2015. The most recent mayoral election was held on 13 September 2020, with a runoff held on 27 September, and the results were as follows:

! rowspan=2 colspan=2| Candidate
! rowspan=2| Party
! colspan=2| First round
! colspan=2| Second round
|-
! Votes
! %
! Votes
! %
|-
| bgcolor=| 
| align=left| Christoph Hopp
| align=left| Christian Democratic Union
| 11,438
| 40.5
| 11,572
| 49.2
|-
| bgcolor=| 
| align=left| Sabine Anemüller
| align=left| Social Democratic Party
| 10,965
| 38.8
| 11,955
| 50.8
|-
| bgcolor=| 
| align=left| Martina Maaßen
| align=left| Alliance 90/The Greens
| 3,418
| 12.1
|-
| bgcolor=| 
| align=left| Simon Männersdörfer
| align=left| The Left
| 1,098
| 3.9
|-
| bgcolor=| 
| align=left| Frank a Campo
| align=left| Free Democratic Party
| 935
| 3.3
|-
| bgcolor=| 
| align=left| Siegfried Martin
| align=left| National Democratic Party
| 404
| 1.4
|-
! colspan=3| Valid votes
! 28,258
! 98.2
! 23,527
! 99.5
|-
! colspan=3| Invalid votes
! 521
! 1.8
! 118
! 0.5
|-
! colspan=3| Total
! 28,779
! 100.0
! 23,645
! 100.0
|-
! colspan=3| Electorate/voter turnout
! 63,176
! 45.6
! 63,169
! 37.4
|-
| colspan=7| Source: City of Viersen (1st round, 2nd round)
|}

City council

The Viersen city council governs the city alongside the Mayor. The most recent city council election was held on 13 September 2020, and the results were as follows:

! colspan=2| Party
! Votes
! %
! +/-
! Seats
! +/-
|-
| bgcolor=| 
| align=left| Christian Democratic Union (CDU)
| 11,806
| 41.9
|  1.9
| 22
|  2
|-
| bgcolor=| 
| align=left| Social Democratic Party (SPD)
| 6,669
| 23.7
|  2.3
| 13
|  2
|-
| bgcolor=| 
| align=left| Alliance 90/The Greens (Grüne)
| 5,491
| 19.5
|  7.9
| 11
|  5
|-
| bgcolor=| 
| align=left| The Left (Die Linke)
| 1,417
| 5.0
|  0.5
| 3
| ±0
|-
| bgcolor=| 
| align=left| Free Democratic Party (FDP)
| 1,343
| 4.8
|  0.1
| 3
| ±0
|-
| bgcolor=| 
| align=left| Alternative for Germany (AfD)
| 1,142
| 4.1
| New
| 2
| New
|-
| colspan=7 bgcolor=lightgrey|
|-
| bgcolor=| 
| align=left| Die PARTEI
| 195
| 0.7
| New
| 0
| New
|-
| bgcolor=| 
| align=left| National Democratic Party (NPD)
| 107
| 0.4
|  1.0
| 0
|  1
|-
! colspan=2| Valid votes
! 28,170
! 98.0
! 
! 
! 
|-
! colspan=2| Invalid votes
! 584
! 2.0
! 
! 
! 
|-
! colspan=2| Total
! 28,754
! 100.0
! 
! 54
!  2
|-
! colspan=2| Electorate/voter turnout
! 63,176
! 45.5
!  2.1
! 
! 
|-
| colspan=7| Source: City of Viersen
|}

Economy
The company Mars Incorporated (chocolate bars) is situated in one of Viersen's industrial districts named Dülken-Mackenstein.

 (a big supermarkets chain in Germany) had his headquarter in Viersen, until it was closed in 2010.

Culture

Recurring events
 International Jazz Festival in Viersen's Festival Hall (Festhalle).  September
 The World Championships of Carom billiards take place in Viersen's Festival Hall (Festhalle). March
 Big Carnival Parades in all 3 city parts. The one in Dülken is one of the biggest and most traditional Parades in North Rhine-Westphalia. February
 The Dülkener Schöppenmarkt, a type of flea/junk market, which takes place on the day after the last Carnival parade, is one of Germany's biggest. February
 Big free flea market in Viersen's pedestrian zone, where only children are allowed to sell. Biggest market of this type in Germany. Summer
 "Viersen blüht" (Viersen is blooming) is a voluntary initiative which places arrangements and sculptures of flowers all over the city's pedestrian zone. Summer
 International Biker Meeting, organized by the local biker-club "MC Viersen 1980 e.V.". 2nd weekend each September
Viersen Jazz Festival. 4th weekend each September
 Big kite-flying-festival. Autumn

Main sights
Viersen sculpture collection
Städtische Galerie im Park Viersen
Viersen Bismarck Tower
Festhalle Viersen

Transport
Viersen is connected to the region by a dense bus network and Viersen station. The station is served by various local and regional rail lines.

Notable people
Gustav von Mevissen (1815–1899), businessman and politician
Max Nonnenbruch (1857–1922), painter
Illa Martin (1900–1988), dendrologist, botanist, conservationist and dentist
Albert Vigoleis Thelen (1903–1989), author and translator
Hilde Bruch (1904–1984), psychoanalyst
Erik Martin (1936–2017), writer, songwriter and composer of songs
Helmut Reisen (born 1950), economist
Holger Henke (born 1960), political scientist
Elmar Theveßen (born 1967), TV-journalist and author
Till Brönner (born 1971), musician, arranger and producer
Mirja Boes (born 1971), comedian, actress and singer
Udo Voigt, politician
Roosevelt (born 1990) music producer and singer
Tim Stützle (born 2002), professional ice hockey player for the Ottawa Senators of the NHL

Twin towns – sister cities

Viersen is twinned with:

 Calau, Germany
 Kaniv, Ukraine
 Lambersart, France
 Mittweida, Germany
 Pardesiya, Israel
 Peterborough, England, United Kingdom

References

External links

 
Kempen, Germany

Viersen (district)